The 1951–52 SK Rapid Wien season was the 54th season in club history.

Squad

Squad and statistics

Squad statistics

Fixtures and results

League

References

1951-52 Rapid Wien Season
Rapid
Austrian football championship-winning seasons